Leando is a census-designated place (CDP) in Van Buren County, Iowa, United States. The population was 135 at the 2000 census.

Geography
Leando is located at  (40.832867, -92.085573).

Demographics

As of the census of 2000, there were 135 people, 52 households, and 38 families residing in the CDP. The racial makeup of the CDP was 100.00% White.

There were 52 households, out of which 28.8% had children under the age of 18 living with them, 63.5% were married couples living together, 7.7% had a female householder with no husband present, and 26.9% were non-families. 25.0% of all households were made up of individuals, and 17.3% had someone living alone who was 65 years of age or older. The average household size was 2.60 and the average family size was 3.13.

In the CDP, the population was spread out, with 23.0% under the age of 18, 10.4% from 18 to 24, 24.4% from 25 to 44, 23.7% from 45 to 64, and 18.5% who were 65 years of age or older. The median age was 39 years. For every 100 females, there were 92.9 males. For every 100 females age 18 and over, there were 112.2 males.

The median income for a household in the CDP was $36,875, and the median income for a family was $36,250. Males had a median income of $25,938 versus $18,750 for females. The per capita income for the CDP was $17,097. There were no families and 5.7% of the population living below the poverty line, including no under eighteens and none of those over 64.

Education
The community is within the Van Buren County Community School District; It operates the Douds Elementary Attendance Center, located next to the Leando CDP.

The former Van Buren Community School District once included Douds in its boundary, and accordingly operated the school, then known as Douds Elementary School. The district merged into Van Buren County CSD on July 1, 2019.

References

Census-designated places in Iowa
Census-designated places in Van Buren County, Iowa